MSFT may refer to:

 Microsoft, NASDAQ stock symbol
 Multi-stage fitness test, used to estimate maximum oxygen uptake
 Tricolour Flame ( or MS-FT), a neo-fascist Italian political party